Jonathan Rivierez (born 18 May 1989) is a professional footballer who plays as a defender for  club FBBP01. Born in mainland France, he plays for the Martinique national team.

Career
Rivierez started his career with Chamois Niortais, making his debut for the club on 30 September 2008 in the 0–1 defeat to Aviron Bayonnais in the Championnat National. In the summer of 2009, he joined Lille OSC and made 25 appearances for their reserve team before transferring to Le Havre the following year.

On 26 July 2022, Rivierez signed with FBBP01.

Personal life
Born in mainland France, Rivierez is of Martiniquais descent. He was called up to represent the Martinique national team for a pair of friendlies in March 2022. He debuted with Martinique in a friendly 4–3 win over Guadeloupe on 26 March 2022.

References

External links
 
 

Living people
1989 births
People from Le Blanc-Mesnil
Footballers from Seine-Saint-Denis
Martiniquais footballers
Martinique international footballers
French footballers
French people of Martiniquais descent
Association football defenders
Chamois Niortais F.C. players
Lille OSC players
Le Havre AC players
FC Metz players
Stade Malherbe Caen players
Football Bourg-en-Bresse Péronnas 01 players
Ligue 1 players
Ligue 2 players
Championnat National players